Florian Naroska (born 16 April 1982 in Mühlacker) is a German water polo player who competed in the 2008 Summer Olympics.

References

1982 births
Living people
People from Mühlacker
Sportspeople from Karlsruhe (region)
German male water polo players
Olympic water polo players of Germany
Water polo players at the 2008 Summer Olympics
21st-century German people